Taber MacCallum is the co-founder and co-CEO of Space Perspective, a human spaceflight company planning to take people and payloads to the edge of space by balloon, and the former Chairman of the Commercial Spaceflight Federation (CSF). He is co-founder and former CTO of World View Enterprises, a stratospheric balloon company using its un-crewed Stratollite for remote communications and sensing. MacCallum was also a founding member of the Biosphere 2 design team and a crew member from the original two-year mission inside the materially-closed ecological system.

Prior to World View, MacCallum served as co-founder, CEO and CTO of Paragon Space Development Corporation, a designer and manufacturer of hazardous environment life support equipment. During his tenure at Paragon, MacCallum served as the CTO and safety officer for Alan Eustace's world record altitude skydive, a project that launched Eustace to  under a helium balloon in 2014. He also served as Chief Technology Officer for Inspiration Mars Foundation, which detailed plans for an almost two-year fly-by mission around Mars with two crew members, and published performance data from a complete life support system hardware demonstration, demonstrating recycling of wastewater and oxygen.

Space Perspective 
Space Perspective is a high-altitude flight tourism company, founded and incorporated in 2019 by Taber MacCallum and Jane Poynter with plans to launch its nine-person "Spaceship Neptune" manned balloon from NASA Kennedy Space Center.

On June 18, 2020, Space Perspective announced its plans to balloon passengers to nearly 100,000 feet above the Earth for roughly USD$125,000 per ticket.

On December 2, 2020 Space Perspective closed its seed funding round; US$7 million of funding was gathered. The company plans first unmanned test flight in the first half of 2021 and manned operational flights by end of 2024.

World View 

World View Enterprises, doing business as World View, is a private American near-space exploration and technology company headquartered in Tucson, Arizona, founded with the goal of increasing access to and the utilization of the stratosphere for scientific, commercial, and economic purposes.

The Stratollite

The Stratollite is a remotely operated, navigable, uncrewed stratospheric flight vehicle designed and engineered to station-keep over customer-specified areas of interest for long periods of time (days, weeks, and months). The Stratollite uses proprietary altitude control technology to rise and lower in the stratosphere, harnessing the natural currents of varying stratospheric winds to provide point-to-point navigation and loitering. The Stratollite is primarily used for applications including remote sensing, communications, and weather.

Paragon Space Development Corporation 
Taber is a co-founder and served as CEO for over 20 years. He was the Principal Investigator on four microgravity experiments on the Space Shuttle, Mir Space Station and International Space Station using Paragon's patented Autonomous Biological System, a long duration plant and aquatic animal life support system and has supported numerous other biological experiments on the Space Shuttle and International Space Station. He conceived and was involved in the design of a Mars space suit portable life support system technology funded by NASA, life support and thermal control systems for commercial manned orbital and suborbital spacecraft, as well as hazardous environment life support technology for U.S. Navy divers. In 2008, Popular Science named MacCallum Inventor of the Year.

Biosphere 2 
Prior to Paragon, MacCallum was a founding member of the Biosphere 2 Design, Development, Test and Operations team, and a crew member in the first two-year mission.

MacCallum's training for Biosphere 2 led him to work on a research vessel, eventually holding every level of command, sailing to over 40 ports and over 30,000 miles around the world. Training in Singapore, he became certified as a dive controller and Advanced Open Water Diving Instructor. He served as dive master for a project to reintroduce two captive dolphins to the wild.

References

Further reading 
INC 500 Start-up Success Stories
MOCA Tucson Board Member Announcement

External links 
SpacePerspective.com

Living people
Space scientists
American chief technology officers
American technology chief executives
Year of birth missing (living people)